Eremascus is the sole genus in the fungal family Eremascaceae. The genus was circumscribed by Eduard Eidam in 1883, while the family was circumscribed by Adolf Engler and E. Gilg in 1924. Eremascus is thought to be a basal fungus, from which ascomycetous yeasts formed. Taxa have a widespread distribution, and grow saprobically, especially on substrates with low water content.

Morphology
Species of Eremascus produce no arthrospores or conidia. There are generally eight spores produced in each ascus.

References

Eurotiomycetes
Ascomycota genera
Eurotiomycetes genera
Taxa described in 1883